Sohn Kee-chung (August 29, 1912 – November 15, 2002) was an Olympic athlete and long-distance runner. He became the first ethnic Korean to win a medal at the Olympic Games, winning gold in the marathon at the 1936 Berlin Olympics.  He was a Korean national, but he had to compete as a member of the Japanese delegation because Korea was under Japanese colonization at the time. Sohn set an Olympic record of 2 hours 29 minutes 19.2 seconds.

Sohn competed under the Japanese name , as Korea was under the colonial rule of the Japanese Empire during his career.

Early life
Sohn Kee-chung was born in what is now Sinuiju, North P'yŏngan Province, North Korea, which was occupied by Japan at the time. He studied at Yangchung High School (양정고등학교) in Seoul and Meiji University in Tokyo, where he graduated in 1940.

Athletics career
Sohn first competed in the 1,500 and 5,000 m, but turned to longer distances after winning an eight-mile race in October 1933. Between 1933 and 1936, he ran 12 marathons; he finished in the top three on all occasions and won nine. On November 3, 1935 in Tokyo, Japan, Sohn set a world record in the marathon with a time of 2:26:42, which broke the world record 2:26:44 set by Yasuo Ikenaka of Japan at the Berlin Olympic trials on April 3, 1935, in Tokyo, Japan. According to the International Association of Athletics Federations, the record remained unbroken until Sohn's own trainee, Suh Yun-Bok, won the 1947 Boston Marathon. Unofficially, he even ran a marathon with a time under 2:24 on April 27, 1935 in Seoul, South Korea.

1936 Berlin Olympics
Sohn, competing for the Empire of Japan, won the gold medal at the 1936 Summer Olympics in the marathon. He ran the  course in 2:29:19.2, breaking the Olympic record. His Korean teammate Nam Sung-yong took the bronze medal. As Korea was under Japanese occupation at the time, the International Olympic Committee (IOC) officially credited Japan with Sohn's gold and Nam's bronze in the 1936 Summer Olympics medal count.

On December 9, 2011, the IOC recognized Sohn's Korean nationality in his official profile. It cited his efforts to sign his Korean name and his stress on Korea's status as a separate nation during interviews. The move was part of the Korean Olympic Committee's repeated requests to acknowledge Sohn's background. However, the IOC ruled out changing the nationality and registered name per official records to prevent historical distortions.

Political significance 
It is the romanization of the Japanese pronunciation of his Korean name in hanja.

Sohn refused to acknowledge the Japanese anthem while it was played at his award ceremony and later told reporters that he was ashamed to run for Japan. When the Dong-a Ilbo published a photograph of Sohn at the medal ceremony, it altered the image to remove the Japanese flag from his running tunic. The act enraged the Japanese Governor-General of Korea Minami Jiro in Seoul. The Kempetai military police imprisoned eight people connected with the newspaper and suspended its publication for nine months.

Hellenic prize  
For winning the marathon, Sohn was to have received an ancient Corinthian helmet from the 8th century BC, which was discovered at Olympia, Greece, and later purchased by a newspaper in Athens to give as an Olympic award. However, the IOC believed that presenting such a valuable gift to a runner would violate its amateur rules. The helmet was placed in a Berlin museum and remained there for 50 years. It was finally presented to Sohn in 1986. Sohn donated the helmet to the National Museum of Korea, which designated it as the 904th and only Western National Treasure. There was initially a plan to award replicas of this helmet to the winners of the 2006 Sohn Kee-chung marathon, but they eventually got only a chance to wear a replica.

Later life

Sohn spent the remainder of his career in South Korea coaching other notable runners such as Suh Yun-Bok, the winner of the Boston Marathon in 1947; Ham Kee-Yong, winner of the Boston Marathon in 1950; and Hwang Young-Cho, who was the gold medalist of the 1992 Summer Olympics marathon, and whom Sohn Kee-chung especially went to Barcelona to see. Sohn also became the Vice Chairman of the Korean Sport & Olympic Committee. At the 1988 Summer Olympics in Seoul, he was given the honor of carrying the Olympic torch in the stadium during the opening ceremony.

Sohn authored an autobiography entitled My Motherland and Marathon.

He was honoured with the Moran Class of the Korean Order of Civil Merit (Hangul:).

Death and legacy
Sohn died at midnight on November 15, 2002, at age 90 from pneumonia. He was buried at the Daejeon National Cemetery. The Sohn Kee-chung Memorial Park in Seoul was established in his honor. He was also posthumously made a Grand Cordon (Blue Dragon) of the Order of Sport Merit.

In popular culture
The historical Korean drama Bridal Mask referred to Sohn Kee-chung's Olympic win and to the arrest of the Korean journalists in its 21st episode. In a parade scene, spectators wave Japanese flags to a Korean boxer parading through on a jeep. Despite the joyous occasion, the boxer's face remains staid and never smiles, and the Japanese flag is on his shirt. The boxer just won an international sports title, a first for a Korean. However, the Japanese occupation makes the boxer represent Japan, rather than Korea, and claims that victory.

As the parade continues, spectators suddenly unveil their Korean flags, which they got the night before, wave them, and shout for Korea. In solidarity with the crowd, the boxer then rips the Japanese flag from his shirt. With tearful eyes and a determined face, he raises his fists and repeatedly cheers with the crowd, "", a pro-Korean independence slogan.

The reporter Song takes a picture of the emotional scene. The picture appears in the newspaper's front page the next day, and government officials learn about the incident. The picture also angers Kimura, a high-ranking police officer. At the police station, he orders officers to arrest the boxer and to punish him harshly for disrespecting Japan. The police therefore arrest him and the journalists, and the government close the newspaper.

Sohn also appears in Zainichi author Yu Miri's semi-autobiographical novel The End of August (） about her grandfather, Yang Im-deuk, who was a rival of Sohn's when they were young.

Actors who played Sohn Kee-chung
 Portrayed by Yoon Hee-won in the 2011 film My Way.

See also
 List of people of Korean descent

References

External links

 Profile on www.olympic.org

1912 births
2002 deaths
People from Sinuiju
Korean male long-distance runners
Korean male marathon runners
Japanese male marathon runners
Japanese male long-distance runners
South Korean male long-distance runners
South Korean male marathon runners
Olympic male marathon runners
Olympic athletes of Japan
Olympic gold medalists for Japan
Olympic gold medalists in athletics (track and field)
Athletes (track and field) at the 1936 Summer Olympics
Medalists at the 1936 Summer Olympics
World record setters in athletics (track and field)
Japan Championships in Athletics winners
Korea University alumni
Recipients of the Order of Civil Merit (Korea)
Deaths from pneumonia in South Korea